Callopanchax occidentalis is a species of killifish in the family Nothobranchiidae. It is endemic to Sierra Leone and western Liberia.

Ecology

The species is an annual killifish whose eggs survive in the mud during the dry season. It inhabits pools, swampy sections of streams and temporary swamps in rainforest and forested savannah, feeding on small invertebrates.

References 

Nothobranchiidae
Fish described in 1966